Lorna Joann Griffin (born June 9, 1956, in Hamilton, Montana) is a retired female shot putter and discus thrower from the United States. She was a two-time silver medalist at the 1983 Pan American Games. Griffin qualified for the 1980 U.S. Olympic team but was unable to compete due to the 1980 Summer Olympics boycott. She did however receive one of 461 Congressional Gold Medals created especially for the spurned athletes. She competed for the United States at the 1984 Summer Olympics, finishing in 9th (shot put) and 12th place (discus).

References

External links
 
 
 

1956 births
Living people
People from Hamilton, Montana
Track and field athletes from Montana
American female shot putters
American female discus throwers
Congressional Gold Medal recipients
Olympic track and field athletes of the United States
Athletes (track and field) at the 1984 Summer Olympics
Pan American Games track and field athletes for the United States
Pan American Games silver medalists for the United States
Pan American Games medalists in athletics (track and field)
Athletes (track and field) at the 1983 Pan American Games
Medalists at the 1983 Pan American Games
20th-century American women